The Incest Diary is a 2017 memoir by an anonymous author detailing her incestuous and abusive relationship with her father.

Synopsis
The author discusses how her father raped and abused her from ages three to 21 in graphic detail. The author told her mother, grandmother and a family friend about her abuse but was ignored. She eventually confronts her father, who apologizes and cries and goes on to tell the family about it. The author's grandfather tries to force her into a mental institution and her brother has a breakdown for which she feels responsible.

Critical reception
Writing for Vice, Lauren Oyler noted that early reactions to book, such as those published in The Independent, Globe and Mail and Newsweek were "disappointingly conservative". H. C. Wilentz writes in The New Yorker that the book is "carefully wrought", and "the writing is often feverish", also noting that the critics of the book "pick apart the authors' methods and motives rather than engage with the thornier issues of taboo and transgression." In a review in The New York Times, Dwight Garner praised the prose in the book as "clear and urgent" commenting that the "book offers more sensation than perspective."

References

2017 non-fiction books
American memoirs
Farrar, Straus and Giroux books
Incestual abuse
Works about child sexual abuse
Works about dysfunctional families
Works published anonymously
Bloomsbury Publishing books